David Goldman may refer to:

David Goldman (businessman) (1937–1999), founder of The Sage Group
David E. Goldman (1910–1998), scientist
David P. Goldman (born 1951), writer and economist, and columnist under the pen name Spengler
David Goldman, a party in the Goldman child abduction case